Pas Khvori (also Romanized as Pas Khvorī, Paskhorī, and Pas Khūrī) is a village in Pain Velayat Rural District, Razaviyeh District, Mashhad County, Razavi Khorasan Province, Iran. At the 2006 census, its population was 161, in 43 families.

References 

Populated places in Mashhad County